Alex Oke is a Nigerian chef.

Early life and education
Alex was born to a Yoruba father and a Russian mother. He was raised in Ibadan and he has two older siblings. He attended the International School Ibadan before furthering his education at Wichita State University in the United States. He also studied in the United Kingdom, Canada and volunteered for refugees in Israel. He transitioned from a six-year marketing and management career after his graduate studies to the culinary arts. He revealed that his love for cooking instilled by his mother at an early age inspired his change of career to the culinary arts. From his early childhood, he learnt to make pizza, cakes, pastries and cook indigenous Nigerian meals like jollof Rice, puff-puff and akara.

Career
Alex trained in classical and contemporary French cuisine at the Pacific Institute of Culinary Arts (PICA) in Vancouver, British Columbia, Canada, and also worked for a period at Lear Faye in East Vancouver before returning to Nigeria. He makes Nigerian recipes influenced with European and Asian cuisine to create his own style of cooking which he describes as "gentrified Nigerian food". He adopts local Nigerian ingredients to produce traditional European pastries.
Alex is the owner of XO Boutique Bakery and also an instructor at the Culinary Academy in Lagos, Nigeria.

References

External links

International School, Ibadan alumni
Nigerian chefs
Nigerian people of Russian descent
Living people
21st-century Nigerian businesspeople
20th-century births
Yoruba businesspeople
Pastry chefs
People from Ibadan
Businesspeople from Lagos
Nigerian expatriates in Canada
Year of birth missing (living people)
Wichita State University alumni
Male chefs